Live from Brixton: Chapter Two is a live performance of heavy metal band Bullet for My Valentine recorded at Brixton Academy on 9 and 10 December 2016, the two last concerts of the band's UK tour celebrating the 10th anniversary of their first album, The Poison. It was released in July 2017 as a double CD for each night, a double DVD or a single Blu-Ray for both nights and a triple red vinyl only for Night Two. It was released through PledgeMusic only.

The band's first album The Poison was played in its entirety on the second night, which was already the case on some dates of the tour.

This is the first live album of the band under Spinefarm Records' label and the second release, the first one being the single "Don't Need You".

Track listing
Night One

Night Two

Credits

Bullet for My Valentine
Matthew Tuck - lead vocals, screaming vocals, rhythm
Micheal Paget - lead guitar, backing vocals
Jamie Mathias - bass guitar, backing vocals, screaming vocals
Jason Bowld - drums

Crew
Tour Manager - John Daddyy
Road Manager - Dave Lucas
Front Of House - Adam Boole
Backline Techs - Richie Edwards & Kevin Papworth
Drum Tech/Stage Manager - Stevie Kneale
Monitor Engineer - Pete Fergie
Lightning Director - Tom Campbell
Lightning Assistant - Alessandro Schillaci
Videographer/Photographer - Ryan Chang
Production Manager - Johnnie Allan
Merchandiser - Jack Pepper for Bravado International

Management
Raw Power Management - Craig Jennings, Ryan Richards and Matt Ash
Assistants - Niall Crisp & Mirchell Thomas
Artwork designed - Alex Hillbrook, Ryan Clark & Ryan Chang
Photography - Ryan Chang
Internal Design & Layout - Cürt Evans

Audio
Recording - Chris Goddard
Assistant Engineers - Adam Williams & MJ
mixing - Colin Richardson & Andy Sneap
mastering - Andy Sneap
Mixed and Mastered at - Backstage Studios, Derbyshire, UK
Vinyl Cut - Greg Moore at Finyl Tweak
Live Here Now - Noggin & MJ
Television Facilities - Trickbox TV Ltd
Unit Manager/Guarantee Engineer - Steve Gould
Camera Guarantee - Daniel Brown
Facility Co-ordinator - Katy Yates
Rigger - Wesley Roberts

For Toward Infinity
Camera Supervisor - Jonathan Padley
Camera Operators - Jamie Caroll, Vincent Doyle, Loen Henry, Mark Jerome, Russel Tate
Camera Assistants - Bonny Lockhart, Steve White
Production - Tim Sidwell & Jeremy Mason
Executive Producters - MJ & Noggin
Director/Editor - Tim Sidwell

Bullet for My Valentine albums
Albums recorded at the Brixton Academy